James Coffin may refer to:

 James Coffin, member of the Coffin whaling family
 James Henry Coffin (1806–1873), American mathematician and meteorologist